Jessica Canizales (born 30 July 1979) is a Brazilian-American model and also the prize winner of Miss Miami Beach in 2006, Miss Grand Prix in 2005, and Miss September 2003 Hawaiian topic. She was the playmate of January 2007 for the Mexican edition of Playboy and the playmate of May 2008 for the Colombian edition.

Bikini contests and pageants

References

External links

JessicaCanizalesVIP.com

Brazilian female models
1979 births
Living people
People from Fort Lauderdale, Florida